Crazy Hair is a book by Neil Gaiman and Dave McKean, published in 2009 in the United States by HarperCollins, and in the United Kingdom by Bloomsbury. It is based on a poem by Gaiman, with artwork by McKean.
In the story a father and daughter discover the joys of his crazy hair.

It is also available in Italian.

Reception
The book was well received, with positive reviews. It was a runner up for the Kate Greenaway Award (2010).

References

External links
 LibraryThing page
 Harper Collins book information page

2009 children's books
Books by Neil Gaiman
American picture books
British children's books
British picture books
Fantasy books
HarperCollins books